Strontium lactate is a chemical compound, a salt of strontium and lactic acid with the formula . This salt is stable and non-radioactive.

Synthesis
Strontium lactate can be obtained by neutralizing moderately dilute lactic acid with strontium carbonate or hydroxide and evaporating the resulting solution to dryness with a moderate heat.

Physical properties
The compound forms white powder.

Soluble in water.

Use
Strontium lactate is used as a dietary supplement for treating osteoporosis and supporting bones and teeth.

References

Lactates
Strontium compounds